Francis Lü Shouwang (吕守旺; 1966 – April 30, 2011) was the Roman Catholic bishop of the Roman Catholic Diocese of Yichang, China.

He was ordained a bishop in 2007 with the approval of Pope Benedict XVI and the Chinese government.

Notes

21st-century Roman Catholic bishops in China
1966 births
2011 deaths
Yichang